Aygedzor (formerly, Mugandzhug, Magandzhug, Magandzh, Maghanjugh, and Mughanjugh) is an abandoned town in the Syunik Province of Armenia.

See also 
Syunik Province

References 

Populated places in Syunik Province